Santo Domingo Xagacía is a town and municipality in Oaxaca in south-western Mexico. It is part of the Villa Alta District in the center of the Sierra Norte Region.

In 2004, the municipality had a total population of approx. 1,000.

References

Municipalities of Oaxaca